C B Patel International Cricket Stadium  is cricket stadium in Surat, Gujarat, India. The stadium is named as CB Patel.

The ground is constructed by Bharthana's leading farmer Raju G Patel & C B Patel Group in the year and half period on the 3.75 sq. ft land of Veer Narmad South Gujarat University in Surat. The ground is developed with 2 lakh sq. ft according to the standards of international stadium. The stadium can accommodate 35,000 people.

Then Gujarat Chief Minister and Gujarat Cricket Association head Narendra Modi laid the foundation of the stadium in November 2009. The ground received a donation from a cricket lover Kamlesh Patel. He donated Rs. 5 crore.

In February 2011, Narendra Modi then Chief Minister of Gujarat and Gujarat Cricket Association Chief inaugurated the stadium.

See also
 List of tourist attractions in Surat

References

External links
 cricket stadium

Cricket grounds in Gujarat
University sports venues in India
Sports venues in Surat
2011 establishments in Gujarat
Sports venues completed in 2011
www.cbphealth.club